Azul (English: "blue", for the stream Azul, which flows through the area) is the head city of the Azul Partido, located at the center of the Buenos Aires Province in Argentina, 300 km south of Buenos Aires.

Its principal, goods-producing economic activities are agriculture and the raising of cattle for meat and leather exports. Home to a dynamic services sector, over 2,000 commercial businesses are registered in the city.

The town was founded on December 16, 1832, following Governor Juan Manuel de Rosas' orders for the construction of a fort, San Serapio Mártir del Arroyo Azul, to guard against indigenous raids. Subsequent land grants led to the development of a stable community, and in 1895, Azul was formally declared a town by provincial authorities. The local cathedral, Nuestra Señora del Rosario, was consecrated in 1906. 

The town's cemetery portal and main slaughterhouse were both designed by architect Francisco Salamone, and contain elements of Art Deco style. Built in the late 1930s, these buildings were some of the first examples of modern architecture in rural Argentina. The town was the scene of an attack on outlying Army barracks by far-left ERP militants on January 19, 1974, the most violent assault of its kind in the country up to that point.

Azul is home to the schools of Agronomy and Law of the National University of Central Buenos Aires. The Teatro Español, founded in the city in 1897, is among the most important of the central pampas area, and in 1992, hosted the Bolshoi Ballet.

The Miguel de Cervantes Festival is held there every spring since 2007, and Casa Ronco, an antiquarian library and museum, maintains the country's best collections relating to the noted Spanish writer. Casa Ronco is named after the collector Bartolomé Ronco. Azul was declared Argentina's "City of Cervantes" by UNESCO in 2007.

Personalities 

 Bartolomé Ronco (1881-1952) - antiquarian, he held one of the greatest collection of Miguel de Cervantes' works.
 Matías Almeyda (1974) - former football player and manager.
 Federico Delbonis (1990) - professional tennis player.
 Mateo Banks (1872-1949) - first Argentine mass murderer, he killed six relatives and two family's employees in 1922.

Climate

References

 Tandilfullchat, Gente zona de Azul Pcia.Bs.As.

 

 
Populated places in Buenos Aires Province
Populated places established in 1832
Cities in Argentina
1832 establishments in Argentina
Argentina